edtFTPj is an open-source FTP client library for use in Java applications licensed under the LGPL. It was first released in 2000, and was originally known as the Java FTP Client Library. It is supplied as a JAR file and can be used in any Java application that requires FTP functionality.

edtFTPj provides FTP capabilities for popular software packages such as Jalbum and Cyberduck.

See also

 Comparison of FTP client software

External links
 
 

Free FTP clients